Casa 74, also known as 255 East 74th Street, is a 30-story, 87-apartment condominium building. It is situated at the corner of Second Avenue and East 74th Street on the Upper East Side of Manhattan, New York City.

The building was developed by World-Wide Holdings Corporation. It was designed by Hugh Hardy's H3 Hardy Collaboration Architecture together with SLCE Architects, and built in 2008.

The building contains primarily three-to-five bedroom apartments, duplexes, and penthouses, with  ceilings.

The lower floors of the building house a  Equinox gym. The building includes a  children’s pavilion, and a private  garden.

In 2008, apartments in the building sold for prices ranging up to $4,000-per-square-foot. In 2009, a penthouse was purchased for $12.98 million. Also in 2009, the developer rented out five of the building's apartments, at $13,000-per-month for three-bedroom apartments, and $18,000-per-month for a four-bedroom apartment.

Poet John Giorno lived at the address, when a small carriage house was located on the property, before the current building was built.

References

External links
Building website

Residential buildings in Manhattan
Residential buildings completed in 2008
Upper East Side
Condominiums and housing cooperatives in Manhattan
Second Avenue (Manhattan)
2008 establishments in New York City